William Coghlan is a former tennis player from Australia.

Biography
Coghlan won the junior title at the 1960 Australian Championships.

A Melbourne real estate agent by profession, he made regular appearances at his home grand slam tournament, twice making the third round. He was a semi-final in the men's doubles at the 1967 Australian Championships, partnering David Power of the United States.

He is a younger brother of tennis player Lorraine Coghlan.

References

External links
 
 

Living people
Australian male tennis players
Year of birth missing (living people)
Australian Championships (tennis) junior champions
Tennis players from Melbourne
Grand Slam (tennis) champions in boys' singles
20th-century Australian people